Calosoma monticola is a species of ground beetle in the subfamily of Carabinae. It was described by Casey in 1913.

References

monticola
Beetles described in 1913